In Real Life (formerly known as In the Real World) is a Canadian reality show where eighteen young contestants aged 12–14 race across North America and compete in a series of real-life jobs, aimed to "discover the skills, strength, and stamina it takes to make it in real life." The show is developed and produced by Apartment 11 Productions.

The first season was originally planned to premiere on February 4, 2009 as In the Real World. but was delayed one month.  The first season premiered on March 4, 2009 and concluded on June 3, 2009.

The winner was 13-year-old Ruby-Rae Rogawski from Langley, British Columbia.

Contestants

 Ages at time of filming

Results

 This contestant won the big reward
 This contestant won the wrench
 This contestant found the shield
 This contestant received a new team member. The original teams were: 
Red Team: Aaron and Jaicyea 
Grey Team: Landon and Isiah 
Brown Team: Graeme and Tyler 
 This experience allowed the remaining competitors to swap teams
 At the end of this experience, any shields that teams possessed were now out of play
 Beginning in this experience, all teams were dissolved and competitors competed alone
 Beginning in this experience, any shields that players possessed were now out of play

 Maddison quit towards the end of the final experience resulting in Ruby-Rae winning the competition.

Red means the contestant was eliminated.
Blue means the episode was a non-elimination episode, therefore the contestant was not eliminated.
Purple means the contestant used the shield to escape elimination.
Gold means the contestant won the competition.
Silver means the contestant was the runner up.
» represents the contestant who used the wrench, « represents the contestant who got delayed by it.

Episode Summary

Episode 1: Auto Racing 
Aired: Wednesday, March 4, 2009.

Location: Atlanta, Georgia

 Prize: Remote Control Go Kart
 Shield: Not Found

Episode 2: Alligator Wranglers 
Aired: Wednesday, March 11, 2009

Location: Florida City, Florida

 Prize: Air-Boat Ride
 Wrench Used On: Yellow Team
 Shield: Found by Red Team (Aaron & Jaicyea)

Episode 3: Rodeo Cowboys and Cowgirls 
Aired: Wednesday, March 18, 2009

Location: Rose Hill, Kansas

 Prize: Electric Guitars
 Wrench Used On: Grey Team
 Shield: Not Found

Episode 4: Hollywood Stunt Performers 
Aired: Wednesday, March 25, 2009Location: Hollywood, Los Angeles, California Prize: Hollywood Tour
 Wrench Used On: Grey Team
 Shield: Not Found

 Episode 5: Farm Frenzy Aired: Wednesday, April 8, 2009Location: Vermilion, Alberta Prize: Speedpass to "Galaxy Land" Amusement Park in West Edmonton Mall
 Wrench Used on: Yellow Team
 Shield: Not Found

 Episode 6: Firefighting Aired: Wednesday, April 15, 2009Location: Vermilion, Alberta Prize: Hot Air Balloon Ride
 Wrench Used On: Red Team
 Shield: Not Found/ Used by Grey Team (Isiah & Jaicyea)

Notes
 At the start of the experience, Sabrina gave the remaining teams an opportunity to split from their teammates, and pair up with someone else
 Both Isiah and Landon from the Grey Team, Aaron from the Red Team, and Graeme from the Brown Team stepped up - the Purple and Yellow Teams stayed together
 Aaron and Graeme became the new Red Team, Jaiceya and Isiah  became the new Grey Team, and Landon and Tyler became the new Brown Team
 Because Aaron and Jaicyea had a Shield and split up as a team, both challengers took Shields into their new teams - Aaron (Red Team) and Jaicyea (Grey Team)

 Episode 7: ER Aired: Wednesday, April 22, 2009Location: Montreal, Quebec Prize: Nintendo Wii with Trauma Centre: New Blood
 Wrench Used On: Purple Team
 Shield: Found by Yellow Team (Talon & Maddison)

 Episode 8: Dirty Jobs Aired: Wednesday, April 29, 2009Location: Côte Saint-Luc & Montreal, Quebec Prize:
 Wrench Used On: Yellow Team
 Shield: Found by Purple Team (Ben & Ruby-Rae)/ Used by Purple Team (Ben & Ruby-Rae) and Red Team (Aaron & Graeme)

Note:
 At the end of this experience, teams were dissolved.  The challengers would compete individually beginning in the next experience.
 Because teams were dissolved, the Shield found by the Yellow Team (Talon & Maddison) in experience 7 was discarded.
 All teams in this experience had a shield by the 3rd job

 Episode 9: The Circus Aired: Wednesday, May 6, 2009Location: Montreal, Quebec Prize: iPod Nano
 Shield: Found by Talon

 Episode 10: Adventure Guides Aired: Wednesday, May 13, 2009Location: Whistler, British Columbia Prize: Inflatable Kayak
 Wrench Used On: Talon
 Shield: Not Found

 Episode 11: Police Action Aired: Wednesday, May 20, 2009Location: Vancouver, British Columbia Prize: Binoculars
 Wrench Used On: Talon
 Shield: Not Found/ Used by Talon

 Episode 12: Elite Forces Aired: Wednesday, May 27, 2009Location: Chesapeake, Virginia Prize: Paintball Party for 16
 Wrench Used On: Talon
 Shield: Found by Maddison

Notes:
 This was the final experience in which a Shield could be used.
 With Talon's elimination, All male challengers have been eliminated from the season.

 Episode 13: Pilots Aired: June 3, 2009Location: La Jolla, San Diego, California and the Mojave Desert''

 Champion: Ruby-Rae
 Runner-Up: Maddison
 Prize: $15,000 scholarship, Trip for 4 to Hawaii
 Consolation Prize: Laptop
 Wrench Used on: Maddison

Notes:
 The first three challenges were scored by points.  The first challenger to 3 points would receive an advantage of a bonus "hit" in the final challenge - the Dogfight.
 In the Dogfight, the challengers would alternate their roles as the "attacking plane" and the "defending plane."  The first challenger to 3 hits would win the competition.
 During the Second Dogfight, Maddison quit, resulting in Ruby-Rae winning the competition.

Season 1 Records

References

2009 Canadian television seasons